is the 40th single by Japanese singer/songwriter Chisato Moritaka. Written by Moritaka and Hideo Saitō, the single was released by zetima on October 1, 1999. It is a re-recording of the song from Moritaka's 1994 album Step by Step. The song was Moritaka's final single before her retirement following her marriage to actor Yōsuke Eguchi and her pregnancy at the end of 1999.

Chart performance 
"Ichido Asobi ni Kite yo '99" peaked at No. 60 on Oricon's singles chart and sold 7,000 copies, making it Moritaka's lowest selling single.

Other versions 
Moritaka re-recorded the song and uploaded the video on her YouTube channel on April 27, 2013. This version is also included in Moritaka's 2013 self-covers DVD album Love Vol. 4.

Track listing

Personnel 
 Chisato Moritaka – vocals, loop drums
 David T. Walker – guitar
 Yasuaki Maejima – Fender Rhodes, keyboards, synthesizer programming

Chart positions

References

External links 
 
 

1999 singles
1999 songs
Japanese-language songs
Chisato Moritaka songs
Songs with lyrics by Chisato Moritaka
Songs with music by Hideo Saitō (musician, born 1958)
Zetima Records singles